Mobarakabad (also Romanized as Mobārakābād and Mubārakābād) is a village in Sardaran Rural District, in the Central District of Kabudarahang County, Hamadan Province, Iran. At the 2006 census, its population was 214, in 57 families.

References 

Populated places in Kabudarahang County